Pirene or Peirene is the name of a fountain or spring in Greek mythology, physically located in Corinth. It was said to be a favored watering-hole of Pegasus, sacred to the Muses. Poets would travel there to drink and receive inspiration.

In the 2nd century AD, the traveler Pausanias describes Pirene as follows:

Another story says that the fountain was created by the hoof of Pegasus striking the ground. The legend Pausanias cites is far more widespread.

The Upper Pirene spring, with its own etiological myth, is located on Acrocorinth, the acropolis of Corinth.

See also
Pirene, a nymph who, according to legend, gave the name to the fountain.

References

External link

Greek mythology
Ancient Greek buildings and structures